Weekend is a 1968 comedy play by Gore Vidal starring John Forsythe, Kim Hunter, and Carol Cole.

The play was profiled in the William Goldman book The Season: A Candid Look at Broadway.

Plot
A Republican senator's son brings home a black girlfriend.

Revival
The play was unsuccessful on Broadway but was revived in 2008.

References

External links
Weekend at Internet Broadway Database

1968 plays
Plays by Gore Vidal